Blacktop Peak is a 12,724-foot-elevation (3,878 meter) mountain summit located along the crest of the Sierra Nevada mountain range, in Mono County of northern California, United States. It is situated in the Ansel Adams Wilderness, on land managed by Inyo National Forest. The summit lies one-half mile outside of Yosemite National Park's eastern boundary, and some of the lower western slope lies within the park. Blacktop Peak ranks as the 228th-highest summit in the state of California.

Blacktop Peak was likely named from its appearance. This geographical feature's name was officially adopted in 1932 by the U.S. Board on Geographic Names.

Climate
According to the Köppen climate classification system, Blacktop Peak is located in an alpine climate zone. Most weather fronts originate in the Pacific Ocean, and travel east toward the Sierra Nevada mountains. As fronts approach, they are forced upward by the peaks (orographic lift), causing them to drop their moisture in the form of rain or snowfall onto the range.

See also
 
 Geology of the Yosemite area

Gallery

References

External links
 Weather forecast: Blacktop Peak

Mountains of Mono County, California
Mountains of the Ansel Adams Wilderness
North American 3000 m summits
Mountains of Northern California
Sierra Nevada (United States)
Inyo National Forest